Aconopteroides is a genus of beetles in the family Cerambycidae, containing a single species, Aconopteroides laevipennis. It was described by Blanchard in 1851.

References

Desmiphorini
Beetles described in 1851
Monotypic Cerambycidae genera